Susan Kathleen Cahn is a historian known for her work on women's studies and LGBTQ topics. She is a professor at the University of Buffalo.

Education and career 
Cahn has a B.A. from the University of California, Santa Cruz (1981) and an M.A. from the University of Minnesota (1985). In 1990 she earned a Ph.D. from the University of Minnesota. In 1992 she joined the faculty at the University of Buffalo where, as of 2022 Cahn is an emeritus professor.

Work 
Cahn is known for her writing on women in sports, adolescence, lesbian history, and chronic illness. Her 1995 book, Coming on Strong: Gender and Sexuality in Twentieth-century Women's Sport examines the role of Title IX in gender equality in sports participation. The book won an award from the North American Society for Sport History, and a second edition was published in 2015. Her work on the rise of women's sports teams, and making women prove their sex has been covered in multiple news outlets. In 2012 she wrote about women growing up in the south in Sexual Reckonings: Southern Girls in a Troubling Age.

Selected publications

Awards and honors 
In 2013 Cahn was named a William S. Vaughn Visiting Fellow by Vanderbilt University. In 2015, Cahn delivered the John R. Betts lecture at the annual meeting of the North American Society for Sport History.

References 

Living people
University of California, Santa Cruz alumni
University of Minnesota alumni
University at Buffalo faculty
Sports historians
American women writers
American women historians
Year of birth missing (living people)